Ariol is an animated television series, based on the French comics of the same title. In France, it was broadcast on TF1, Télétoon+ and Piwi+. In Canada, it was broadcast on Unis. Season 2 was released in 2017. Season 1 was composed of four-minute episodes. For season 2, the episodes were extended to being twelve-minutes long.

Characters
Many of the characters are based on the equivalent in the comics.

Ariol, a donkey, voiced by Sarah Delaby Rochette (season 1)
Ramono, a pig, voiced by Paul Olinger (season 1)
Mr. Blunt, a dog who teaches, voiced by Gerard Thevenet (season 1)
Papi Atole, voiced by Serge Pauthe (season 1)
Petula, a cow, voiced by Lisa Debard (season 1)
Mamie Asine, voiced by Line Wible (season 1)
Mamie Annette, voiced by Marie-Line Permingeat Guinet (season 1)
Bisbille, voiced by Janne-Alice Pitot (season 1)
Tiburge, voiced by Aria Rolland (season 1)
Avoine, voiced by Vincent Tessier (season 1)
Chevalier Cheval, voiced by Jean-Pierre Skalka (season 1)
Mule, voiced by Celine Roche (season 1)

Episodes
Unis TV began broadcasting new episodes in 2020. TV guides did not actually describe each episodes' plot individually, only giving a generic description "La vie quotidienne du heros eponyme, le petit ane bleu Ariol, et de son entourage proche."
"Au vide-grenier" on 8 September 2020
"La dent qui bouge" on 9 September 2020
"Aquaplouf" on 10 September 2020
"Attention travaux" on 11 September 2020

References

External links
 Ariol (season 1) at Folimage
 Ariol (season 2) at Folimage
 Ariol at AB International Distribution

2000s Canadian animated television series
2010s Canadian animated television series
2009 Canadian television series debuts
Canadian children's animated television series
2000s French animated television series
2010s French animated television series
2009 French television series debuts
French children's animated television series
Television series based on French comics
English-language television shows
Television shows set in Paris